Vöcklabruck is a railway station in the town of Vöcklabruck, Upper Austria, Austria. The train services are operated by ÖBB and WESTbahn.

Train services
The station is served by the following services:

References

External links

Austrian Railway (ÖBB) website 

Railway stations in Upper Austria